Antipodes (Perry / Hoffmann - Sinovcic / Marlin / Submarine Adventures / OceanGate) is a 5-person manned submersible.  Antipodes is certified by the American Bureau of Shipping (ABS) and has proven itself as a safe and effective vessel over the course of more than 1,300 dives in a variety of sea conditions.

Early History
Antipodes was derived from a complete refit of the PC-1501 submersible originally built in 1973 by Perry Submarine Builders as a diver lock-out vehicle. It spent several years operating in the North Sea oil fields.

In 1995 Hoffmann Yacht Sales converted the pilot compartment of PC-1501 by installing full (58 inch) diameter, hemispherical windows and window seat forgings at each end of the hull.  The submersible was renamed XPC-1501 and adapted for private recreational use with a dive time of three hours and a depth rating of 1000 feet. It was installed and operated around the world aboard the Mystere, a 200-foot yacht.

New Zealand operation
In 1999 Submarine Adventures Ltd purchased the XPC-1501 and refitted it in Fort Lauderdale, Florida and in Dunedin, New Zealand to extend its working capabilities and renamed it the  Antipodes.  All systems were redesigned with tourism and research in mind.   The Antipodes had a depth rating of 923 feet (281 metres) and an extended bottom time to allow a maximum of eight tourist dives per day, each dive lasting a maximum of 60 minutes.  The refit included installation of two battery pods for greater power capacity, modifications to the propulsion system for improved maneuverability, and upgrades to the life support systems to provide life support for five people for 72 hours. The Antipodes achieved a Certificate of Classification as a +A1 Manned Submersible from the American Bureau of Shipping on 12 February 2002. 

The Antipodes submersible and its support barge were based beside the Milford Sound Underwater Observatory in Harrison Cove, Milford Sound, New Zealand.  Harrison Cove is situated within the boundaries of the Piopiotahi Marine Reserve.  Regular research and tourist dives were undertaken in the vicinity of Harrison Cove and nearby Williamston Point from 2002 to 2003.  The Antipodes also undertook dives in Lake Wakatipu, near Queenstown, New Zealand.

Current operation
In 2009, Antipodes was purchased by OceanGate, Inc., a submarine operating company based out of Everett, Washington, USA. Utilized for deep-water expeditions, the manned submersible Antipodes enables commercial and scientific applications for researchers, scientists, filmmakers and content providers. Under the ownership of OceanGate, Antipodes has been a crucial element of diving operations in Washington State, Miami, Catalina Island and Monterey Bay, California, and the Gulf of Mexico. While typical mission profiles will call for dives of 2–8 hours in duration, Antipodes has, as noted above, the capability to provide life support for five people for 72 hours.

References

Crewed submersibles